The Albert Memorial is a memorial in London, England, to Prince Albert, the consort of Queen Victoria. A related memorial is the adjacent Royal Albert Hall, a concert hall.

It may also refer to:
 Albert Clock, Barnstaple, a clock tower in Barnstaple, Devon
 Albert Memorial Clock, Belfast, a clock tower in Belfast, Northern Ireland
 Royal Albert Memorial Museum, a museum in Exeter, Devon
 The memorial monument in Albert Square, Manchester, a square in Manchester
 Statue of Albert, Prince Consort, a memorial in Perth, Scotland
 Prince Albert Memorial, Swanage, an obelisk memorial in Swanage, Dorset
 Albert Lock, a lock on the Jamestown Canal in Ireland
 Albert Medal (Royal Society of Arts), a medal awarded by the Royal Society of Arts

The Albert Memorial Bridge (Regina, Saskatchewan) is not a memorial to Prince Albert; it is a memorial to WWI soldiers, and it is named 'Albert' as it carries Albert Street.